Cnesteboda assamica is a species of moth of the family Tortricidae. It is found in India (Assam) and the Philippines.

References

Moths described in 1964
Tortricini
Insects of India
Insects of the Philippines